Ganpat University - U. V. Patel College of Engineering (GUNI-UVPCE) is an Institute situated inside Ganpat University campus at Ganpat Vidyanagar, Kherva,  Mehsana in the state of Gujarat, India. UVPCE, which was named in honor of Gujarat industrialist Ugarchandbhai Vanarasibhai Patel who donated Rs. 12.5 million to its foundation, was established in September 1997.

Campus
UVPCE is named in honour of industrialist Shri Ugarchandbhai Vanarsidas Patel, who donated Rs. 115 million towards its construction. The campus holds separate hostels for male and female students and offers dining and shopping facilities. The campus features green spaces and solar powered street lights.

Academics
Since 1997, UVPCE has offered courses in Computer Engineering and Information Technology. In 1998 and 1999, it added Electronics & Communication Engineering and Mechatronics Engineering and has subsequently expanded with several additional courses: Mechanical Engineering (2001), Biomedical Engineering (2001) and Civil Engineering (2008), Marine Engineering (2012). In addition, it offers Master of Technology degrees in Mechanical Engineering — Advanced Manufacturing Techniques (2006) and CAD/CAM (2007). Also offers Masters in Computer Engineering, Information Technology, Civil Engineering, Electronics & Co. and Electrical Engineering.

Student body
The school accepts students who have achieved acceptable scores on the Science Stream of the Higher Secondary Examination (45% open category; 40% reserved category) and who have completed necessary subject work.

External links
Official website of Ganpat University - U. V. Patel College of Engineering.

All India Council for Technical Education
Engineering colleges in Gujarat
Mehsana district